Nedda Francy (November 29, 1908 – January 26, 1982) was an Argentine stage and film actress. Working mostly in Argentina, in 1939 she appeared alongside Vittorio De Sica in the Italian comedy It Always Ends That Way. In 1948 she starred in the historical film Juan Moreira (1948).

Filmography

1928: La borrachera del tango
1929; Mosaico criollo (Short)
1930: El drama del collar
1931: La despedida del unitario (Short)
1931: The Gold Route
1933: El linyera
1935: Monte Criollo
1936: Santos Vega
1937: Palermo
1937: Una porteña optimista
1938: Busco un marido para mi mujer
1939: It Always Ends That Way
1948: Juan Moreira
1949: Las aventuras de Jack

References

Bibliography 
 Goble, Alan. The Complete Index to Literary Sources in Film. Walter de Gruyter, 1999.

External links 
 

1908 births
1982 deaths
Argentine film actresses
People from Buenos Aires
Argentine people of Italian descent
20th-century Argentine actresses